Ying Tung Estate is a public housing estate built on the northeastern coast of Tung Chung, Lantau Island, New Territories, Hong Kong next to Ying Tung Road near The Visionary and Caribbean Coast. It consists of four residential buildings completed in 2018.

Houses

Politics
Ying Tung Estate is located in Tung Chung North constituency of the Islands District Council. It is currently represented by Sammy Tsui Sang-hung, who was elected in the 2019 elections.

See also

Public housing estates on Lantau Island

References

Public housing estates in Hong Kong
Tung Chung